McComas is a surname. Notable people with the surname include:

Alice Moore McComas (1850–1919), American author, editor, lecturer, reformer
Campbell McComas, Australian comedian, writer, and actor
Daniel F. McComas, American politician
David McComas, American space scientist
Edward O. McComas (1919–1954), American flying ace during World War II
Francis McComas (1875–1938), Australian-born artist
George W. McComas (1841–1928), American politician
James Douglas McComas, former president of three U.S. universities
J. Francis McComas, American science fiction editor
Kendall McComas, American child actor
Lorissa McComas, American nude model
Louis E. McComas, American politician
Walter R. McComas (1879–1922), American politician and lawyer

See also
Clan MacThomas, a Scottish clan of the McComases
McComas, West Virginia, an unincorporated community in Mercer County, West Virginia.